Phobos is the ninth studio album by Canadian heavy metal band Voivod. Released on Hypnotic Records in 1997, it is the second and last studio album to feature bassist and vocalist Eric Forrest.

Track listing
Music by Voivod and lyrics by Eric Forrest and Michel Langevin, except where indicated.

1997 European edition bonus tracks

Credits
Voivod
Eric Forrest - bass guitar, vocals
Denis D'Amour - guitars
Michel Langevin - drums, electronics, accordion, artwork

Guest musicians
Karyn Crisis - vocals on track 10
Jason Newsted - bass guitar and vocals on track 12
Ivan Doroschuk, James Cavalluzzo - electronics

Production
Rob Sanzo - production, mixing
James Cavalluzzo - mixing
Brett Zilahi - mastering

References 

1997 albums
Voivod (band) albums